or just  is a fusion of the ancient Japanese belief in ancestral spirits and a Japanese Buddhist custom to honor the spirits of one's ancestors. This Buddhist–Confucian custom has evolved into a family reunion holiday during which people return to ancestral family places and visit and clean their ancestors' graves when the spirits of ancestors are supposed to revisit the household altars.

The festival of Obon lasts for three days; however, its starting date varies within different regions of Japan. When the lunar calendar was changed to the Gregorian calendar at the beginning of the Meiji era, the localities in Japan responded differently, which resulted in three different times of Obon. (Bon in August), based on the lunar calendar, is celebrated around the 15th of August and is the most commonly celebrated time. (Old Bon) is celebrated on the 15th day of the ninth month of the lunar calendar, and so differs each year, which appears between August 8 and September 7. These three festival days are not listed as public holidays, but it is customary for people to be given leave.

History of 

The Japanese Bon Festival originated from the Ghost Festival of China, which is itself a combination of the Buddhist  Festival and the Taoist  Festival.

The Buddhist tradition originates from the story of Maha Maudgalyayana (Mokuren), a disciple of the Buddha, who used his supernatural powers to look upon his deceased mother only to discover she had fallen into the Realm of Hungry Ghosts and was suffering. Greatly disturbed, he went to the Buddha and asked how he could release his mother from this realm. Buddha instructed him to make offerings to the many Buddhist monks who had just completed their summer retreat on the fifteenth day of the seventh month. Mokuren did this and, thus, saw his mother's release. He also began to see the true nature of her past selflessness and the sacrifices she had made for him during her lifetime. The disciple, happy because of his mother's release from suffering and grateful for her many kindnesses, danced with joy. See also: Ullambana Sutra.

As Obon occurs in the heat of the summer, participants traditionally wear , a kind of light cotton kimono. Many Obon celebrations include a huge carnival with rides, games, and summer festival foods.

Fire also marks the commencement as well as the closing of the festival.

Etymology
The Japanese word  is composed of the honorific prefix  and the word .

The Chinese terms are often described as deriving from Sanskrit  meaning "hanging upside down", in reference to souls suffering in hell. However, the Sanskrit word was sparsely, if at all, attested; in addition, it would be the present participle of verb Sanskrit  ("to hang", intransitive), with no inherent "upside-down" meaning.

This suggests that explanations of the dead hanging upside-down in hell are more likely to be folk etymologies based on a mistaken connection to the Sanskrit verb, rather than a more direct semantic link to the Pali. Alternatively, Takakusu Junjiro propounded that the origin was in fact Pali , a colloquial corruption of the Pali  ("raising up; saving; helping"), and that the etymology was mistakenly attributed to Sanskrit.

, meaning simply "Bon dance", is a style of dancing performed during Obon. It is a folk entertainment, which has a history of nearly 600 years. Originally a  folk dance to welcome the spirits of the dead, the style of celebration varies in many aspects from region to region. Each region has a local dance, as well as different music. The music can be songs specifically pertinent to the spiritual message of Obon, or local  folk songs. Consequently, the Bon dance appears different from region to region. Hokkaidō is known for the folk-song . The song  takes its namesake from the capital of Japan.  in Gujō in Gifu Prefecture is famous for all night dancing.  is a folk song from Shiga Prefecture. Residents of the Kansai area will recognize the famous .

The  is usually also the bandstand for the musicians and singers of the Obon music. Some dances reverse during the dance, though most do not. Still some dances, such as the Kagoshima  dance, and the Tokushima , simply proceed in a straight line through the streets of the town.

The dance of a region can depict the area's history and specialization. All dancers perform the same dance sequence in unison.

There are other ways in which a regional Bon dance can vary. Some dances involve the use of different kinds of fans, others involve the use of small towels called  which may have colourful designs.

The Bon dance tradition is said to have started in the later years of the Muromachi period as a public entertainment. In the course of time, the original religious meaning has faded, and the dance has become associated with summer.

Similarly, the Yaeyama Islands have .

Festivals of shared origin

China and Vietnam

India

Korea 
Participants present offerings at Buddhist shrines and temples, and masked dances are performed. It is as much an agricultural festival as a religious one.

Celebrations outside Japan

Philippines
In the Philippines, Filipinos of Japanese descent, with support from the Philippine Nikkei Jin Kai Inc., Philippine Nikkei Jin Kai International School, Mindanao Kokusai Daigaku, and various other Japanese Filipino-based organizations, hold an Obon festival every year along with other Japanese-based Filipino festivals, to celebrate the ancestors of Filipinos of Japanese descent, and to celebrate the friendship between Japan and the Philippines.

Argentina 
In Argentina, the Bon Festival is celebrated by Japanese communities during the summer of the southern hemisphere. The biggest festival is held in Colonia Urquiza, in La Plata. It takes place on the sports ground of the La Plata Japanese School. The festival also includes  shows and typical dances.

Brazil 

Bon Festival is celebrated every year in many Japanese communities all over Brazil, as Brazil is home to the largest Japanese population outside Japan. São Paulo is the main city of the Japanese community in Brazil, and also features the major festival in Brazil, with street  dancing and  dance. It also features  and  contests. The festival also features a variety of Japanese food and drink, art and dance. Bon is also celebrated in communities of Japanese immigrants and their descendants and friends throughout South America: Bon festivals can be found in the states of Santa Catarina, São Paulo, Goiás, Amazonas, Pará (Tomé-Açu), Mato Grosso, Mato Grosso do Sul, Pernambuco, Bahia, Paraná, Rio Grande do Sul and Brasília.

Malaysia 
In Malaysia, Bon Festival is also celebrated every year in Esplanade, Penang, Shah Alam Stadium in Shah Alam, Selangor, and also Universiti Malaysia Sabah at Kota Kinabalu, Sabah. This celebration, which is a major attraction for the state of Selangor, is the brainchild of the Japanese Expatriate & Immigrant's Society in Malaysia. In comparison to the celebrations in Japan, the festival is celebrated on a much smaller scale in Penang, Selangor and Sabah, and is less associated with Buddhism and more with Japanese culture. Held mainly to expose locals to a part of Japanese culture, the festival provides the experience of a variety of Japanese food and drinks, art and dance, with the vast number of Japanese companies in Malaysia taking part to promote their products.

United States and Canada 
Bon festivals are also celebrated in North America, particularly by Japanese-Americans or Japanese-Canadians affiliated with Buddhist temples and organizations. Many temples also concurrently hold a cultural and food bazaar providing a variety of cuisine and art, also to display features of Japanese culture and Japanese-American history. Performances of taiko by both amateur and professional groups have recently become a popular feature of Bon Odori festivals. Bon festivals are usually scheduled anytime between July and September.

 melodies are also similar to those in Japan; for example, the dance  from Kyushu is also performed in the U.S. In California, due to the diffusion of Japanese immigration,  dances also differ from Northern to Southern California, and some are influenced by American culture, such as "Baseball ".

The "Bon season" is an important part of the present-day culture and life of Hawaii. It was brought there by the plantation workers from Japan, and now the Bon dance events are held among the five major islands (Kauai, Oahu, Molokai, Maui and Hawaii) on weekend evenings from June to August. They are held usually at Buddhist missions, but sometimes at Shintoist missions or at shopping centres. At some Buddhist missions, the dance is preceded by a simple ritual where the families of the deceased in the past year burn incense for remembrance, but otherwise the event is non-religious. In larger cities, Bon dance lessons are given by volunteers before the actual events.

Some Japanese museums may also hold Obon festivals, such as the Morikami Museum in Florida.

In St. Louis, Missouri, the Botanical Garden has hosted a Bon festival over Labor Day weekend every year since 1977. Known as the Japanese festival, it is a collaboration with several Japanese-American organizations, and hosts thousands of people over a three-day period.

See also
, the concept of offering food to the hungry ghosts in Japanese Buddhism
Awa Dance Festival
Ghost Festival, the Chinese counterpart of the Bon Festival.
Parentalia, a festival in ancient Rome to honor ancestors, including bringing offerings to their on the last day, known as Feralia
Pitru Paksha, a Hindu festival that bears similarities to the Bon festival
Day of the Dead, a Mexican festival also revolving around the dead
Qingming Festival
Japanese calendar
Japanese culture
Veneration of the dead
Śrāddha, a Hindu culture celebrated for half moon cycle to give the offerings and honor ancestors. Celebrated in all Indian State.
Takeda Lullaby, a folk lullaby from the Kyoto region in which the Bon Festival is mentioned

References

Bibliography
 Marinus Willem de Visser: Ancient Buddhism in Japan – Sutras and Ceremonies in Use in the 7th and 8th centuries A.D. and their History in Later Times. 2 volumes, Paul Geuthner, Paris 1928–1931; Brill, Leiden 1935, pp 58–115
 Robert J. Smith: Ancestor Worship in Contemporary Japan, Stanford University Press, Stanford, California 1974. 
 Ensho Ashikaga (1950), The Festival for the Spirits of the Dead in Japan, Western Folklore 9 (3), 217-228

External links

 List All Japanese Obon Festivals & Bon Odori Practices - Schedule
 Bon Dance: Description of various Bon Dance styles and resources.
 Obon Festival in  Japan
  Photo Gallery of Bon Odori 2007 in Penang, Malaysia
 El Bon Odori de La Plata en Argentina

Observances honoring the dead
Buddhist festivals in Japan
Buddhist holidays
July observances
August observances
Articles containing video clips
Observances set by the traditional Japanese calendar
September observances
Buddhism and death